Andrey Kandaurov is a Ukrainian retired footballer.

Career
Andrey Kandaurov, started his career with Metalurh-2 Zaporizhzhia where he played 25 matches and scored 7 goals. In 2005 h2 moved to Obolon-2 Kyiv, playing 13 matches and scored 3 goals and in 2006 he moved to Obolon Kyiv playing 6 matches and scored 2 goals and with Obolon-2 Kyiv playing 24 matches and scored 9 goals. In 2007 he returned  to Obolon Kyiv for two seasons whre he played 40 matches and scored 10 goals. In 2007 he played 5 matched and scored 1 goal. In 2009 he moved for one season for Desna Chernihiv the main club in the city of Chernihiv. In 2011 he moved to Helios Kharkiv until 2014 where he played 68 matches and scored 6 goals.

Honours
Obolon Kyiv
 Ukrainian First League: 2008–09

References

External links 
 Andrey Kandaurov footballfacts.ru
 Andrey Kandaurov allplayers.in.ua

1987 births
Living people
FC Desna Chernihiv players
FC Obolon-Brovar Kyiv players
Ukrainian footballers
Ukrainian Premier League players
Ukrainian First League players
Ukrainian Second League players
Association football midfielders